The Caudron C.570 was a French twin-engine aircraft designed and built by Caudron in the mid-1930s. It was designed to function in multiple roles; as a bomber, passenger transport, paratroop aircraft, cargo aircraft and air ambulance.

Design
The Caudron C.570 was primarily designed to fill a gap in the types of aircraft available to French armed forces, that of a troop-carrier, though it could take on other roles. It was a low wing cantilever monoplane with wings in three parts, a  span rectangular centre section and outer trapezoidal panels, ending in rounded tips. The wings were built around twin box spars made of spruce and plywood.  The central section had an aluminium frame and light metal skin; the outer panels were ply-covered. Multi-section ailerons filled more than half the span of the outer panels' trailing edges.

The C.570 had a square section fuselage. Its -long forward part, reaching aft to the wing trailing edges, housed the crew and up to eighteen troops and was built with aluminium longerons and frames, skinned in light alloy. There was a cabin in the nose for a crew-member who acted as navigator, bomb aimer and second pilot and behind that, ahead the engines, a well glazed pilot's cabin with side-by-side seating. Immediately behind the pilot was a cabin for the wireless operator and also four passengers. Next came the main cabin, which seated fourteen men and finally a small cabin for any injured.  The distribution of the crew may have depended on the designated role, e.g. transport or bomber, as Flight describes a different arrangement. Access to the forward cabins was via a large port-side door. The main cabin had another large door on the starboard side at the rear; there was also a trapdoor large enough for four parachutists to leave together.  The rear part of the fuselage was a welded chrome-molybdenum steel tube girder, fabric covered over a light wooden frame.

It was powered by two  water-cooled Renault 18Jbr 18-cylinder W engines, mounted on welded steel tubes in the wing centre section with radiators below them.

The C.570 had a twin tail with its tailplane mounted at the top of the fuselage. Together with the elevators it was trapezoidal in plan; the fins were of the endplate type, oval in profile and with rudders split into two sections to allow elevator movement. Both horizontal and vertical control surfaces had Flettner-type servo tabs. Below the tail was a fixed tailwheel.

Development

The C.570 flew for the first time, with pilots Delmotte and Lacombe and engineer Marcel Riffard, on 24 November 1935. By July 1936 it was undergoing official tests at Villcaoublay. In November it appeared there amongst an array of prototypes and its prolonged trials were only ended in September 1937, by when it had acquired the name Kangourou.

Specifications

References

1930s French military transport aircraft
C.570
Low-wing aircraft
Aircraft first flown in 1935
Twin piston-engined tractor aircraft